Nord, a word meaning "north" in several European languages, may refer to:

Acronyms 
 National Organization for Rare Disorders, an American nonprofit organization
 New Orleans Recreation Department, New Orleans, Louisiana, US

Film and television
 Nord (1991 film), a film directed by Xavier Beauvois
 Nord (2009 film), or North, a Norwegian film directed by Rune Denstad Langlo

Music 
 Nord (Siddharta album), 2001
 Nord (Year of No Light album), 2006
 Nord, an album by Luna Amară, 2018
 Nord, the brand name for musical instruments produced by Clavia.
 A. G. NORD, the fifth disc from the album 7G, by A. G. Cook.
 Nord (Gåte album), 2021

People
 Bjorn Nord (born 1972), Swedish ice hockey player
 Christiane Nord (born 1943), German translation scholar
 Daniel Nord, Swedish civil servant
 Elizabeth Nord (1902–1986), American labor organizer
 , Norwegian software expert
 John Nord (born 1959), American professional wrestler
  (1912–2003), German anti-Nazi activist
 Kathleen Nord (born 1965), German swimmer
 Keith Nord (born 1957), American football player
 Ole Tom Nord (born 1940), Norwegian skier
  (1875–?), Danish cyclist
 Pierre Nord (1900–1985), French writer and spy
 Richard Nord, film editor 
 Thomas Nord (born 1957), German politician (Die Linke)
 Walter R. Nord (born 1939), American academic

Places 
 Nord (Chamber of Deputies of Luxembourg constituency), an electoral constituency
 Nord (French department)
 Nord (Haitian department)
 Nord, California, US, an unincorporated community
 Nord, Greenland, a military and scientific base
 Nord Region (Burkina Faso)
 Nord Region (Cameroon)

Transportation 
 Nord (yacht), a German superyacht
 Nord Aviation, a former state-owned French aircraft manufacturer
 Chemins de fer du Nord, or the Nord company, a French railway company
 Nord Automobiles aka Nord Motion, a Nigerian automaker

Other uses 
 NORD (ice hockey team), a defunct Ukrainian amateur team
 Nord (novel), published in English as North, a 1960 novel by Louis-Ferdinand Céline
 Nord (video game), a 2009 Facebook video game
 12501 Nord, an asteroid
 6th SS Mountain Division Nord, a WaffenSS division in World War II
 OnePlus Nord, a smartphone 5G by OnePlus
 Nords, a fictional race in the Elder Scrolls fantasy setting
 NordVPN, a VPN service

See also 
 Gare du Nord (disambiguation)
 North (disambiguation)
 Norte (disambiguation), Spanish, Portuguese and Galician for north